Liebers is a German language surname. Notable people with the name include:
 Mario Liebers (born 1960), German former competitive figure skater 
 Martin Liebers (born 1985), German former competitive figure skater
 Matthias Liebers (born 1958), former German footballer
 Peter Liebers (born 1988), German former figure skater.

References 

German-language surnames